KDOT (104.5 MHz) is a commercial FM radio station located in Reno, Nevada. KDOT airs an active rock music format. Its studios are located on Plumb Lane in South Reno, and its transmitter is located on Slide Mountain.

History

Steve Funk was the first program director of KDOT-FM while Rob Williams acted as the operations manager for all of the stations within the Lotus Reno building. Over the first year, some changes in the line-up occurred, the largest being Steve Funk moving to afternoons and Rob Williams taking over the morning drive shift (a slot he had previously done under "KHIT-FM"). Brooke left the station soon after and was replaced with Arnie States, making this the early version of what would later become a very successful morning team, "The Rob, Arnie, and Dawn Show".

Earlier use of KDOT call letters
From 1957 to 1962, the call letters KDOT were used by an AM station in Reno, Nevada, broadcasting on 1230 kHz. That station went "dark" (off the air) in late 1962. The following year, new owners received approval to use the call letters KCBN, and the station returned to the air on October 30, 1963. Since September 13, 2019, that station has used the call letters KZTQ.

In 1964, the call letters KDOT were assigned to an AM radio station in Scottsdale, Arizona, broadcasting on 1440 kHz. Sister station KDOT-FM launched on August 1, 1969, airing beautiful music/easy listening (BM/EZ) until March 31, 1978. The studios of both stations were located in the "beautiful Safari resort." Since February 5, 1986, the FM station in Scottsdale has used the call letters KSLX.

Controversy
On May 28, 2009, Hosts Rob Williams and Arnie States from "The Rob, Arnie, and Dawn Show" drew media attention by advocating violence against LGBT children during their show, in reference to two recent news stories regarding transgender children. States said, "God forbid if my son put on a pair of high heels, I would probably hit him with one of my shoes". Williams and States took turns referring to gender dysphoric children as "idiots" and "freaks," who were just out "for attention" and had "a mental disorder that just needs to somehow be gotten out of them," either by verbal abuse on the part of the parents, or even shock therapy. In response, several advertisers (including Snapple, Sonic, Carl's Jr, Bank of America, Wells Fargo, Verizon, Chipotle Grill, AT&T, and McDonald's) pulled their advertising from KRXQ. Nissan similarly declined to renew an advertising contract with the station. On June 8, 2009, GLAAD announced that the show would issue an apology during a special broadcast including a transgender person.

References

External links
 

Active rock radio stations in the United States
Lotus Communications stations
Radio stations established in 1966
DOT